The Bismarck Cabinet was the first cabinet of the German Empire, led by Otto von Bismarck from the unification of Germany in 1871 until 1890.

Composition

|}

Sources 
 Regenten und Regierungen der Welt, Vol. 2,3. Neueste Zeit: 1492–1917, ed. by B. Spuler; 2nd edition, Würzburg, Ploetz, 1962.

Historic German cabinets
Otto von Bismarck
1871 establishments in Germany
1890 disestablishments in Germany
Cabinets established in 1871
Cabinets disestablished in 1890